Perfect Murder, Perfect Town is a 2000 American television miniseries directed by Lawrence Schiller. The teleplay by Tom Topor is based on Schiller's book of the same title.

Including historic news and talk show footage, it covers in great detail what was considered a botched investigation into the murder of six-year-old JonBenét Ramsey, whose body was found in the basement of her Boulder, Colorado home on December 26, 1996. The police and district attorney openly feuded about how the case should be investigated. Their focus on the girl's parents drew intense worldwide media attention that ultimately made the adults appear guilty to the public. It was revealed in 2013 that a grand jury was willing to indict John and Patsy Ramsey with child abuse resulting in death and accessory to first-degree murder. The prosecutor decided against prosecution due to the unlikelihood of a conviction.

The miniseries originally was broadcast by CBS.

Principal cast
The case includes:
Kris Kristofferson – Lou Smit
Marg Helgenberger – Patsy Ramsey
Ronny Cox – John Ramsey
Dyanne Iandoli – JonBenét Ramsey
Tyler Sharp – Burke Ramsey
Scott Cohen – Steve Thomas
Ken Howard – Alex Hunter
John Heard – Larry Mason
Peter Friedman – Peter Hofstrom
John Rubinstein – Rev. Hoverstock
Jane Powell – Dance Instructor
Dennis Boutsikaris – Chief Koby
Ann-Margret – Nedra Paugh

Principal production credits
Executive producers – Lawrence Schiller, Richard Waltzer
Original music – John Cacavas
Cinematography – Peter Sova
Production design – Steven Legler
Art direction – Kevin Egeland
Set decoration – Eric Weiler
Costume design – Marilyn Matthews

Critical reception
In his review in Variety, Michael Speier said, "While Perfect Murder, Perfect Town isn't the most intellectual project on CBS' docket, it's certainly not the car wreck a lot of people are expecting. Patient and extremely detailed, this look at the Boulder, Colo., tabloid magnet gets high marks for steering clear of sweeps sensationalism ... There are some weak links, especially when it comes to Patsy's behavior. Helgenberger is a good sport, doing her best to get inside the mind of a flighty woman, but her portrayal often comes off as cartoonish and far-fetched. More on the mark is Cox, who creates an aloof millionaire who can't cope with a sudden loss of control ... Credit Schiller, however, for somehow making everybody credible and for crafting a search that leaves no stone unturned. Archival footage of real-life talkshows and local news footage is a nifty addition to an overall solid production."

The Entertainment Weekly critic observed, "The telefilm ... is mostly a tedious slog through the legal details interrupted periodically by noxious images ... Cox and Helgenberger are called upon to do so much weeping and wailing during the first half hour that you wonder if they'll make it through the full four. Cox's John remains a cipher, but Helgenberger manages to convey much of the melodramatic emotionalism that Patsy has frequently displayed without giving a melodramatic performance herself — that's an achievement, even in a big piece of schlock like Perfect Murder ... Taking into account acting performances, script, and direction, Perfect Murder, Perfect Town averages out to a C; combine it with the F-grade moral scruples it took to embark on this exploitive abomination in the first place, however, and you get an all-too-generous D."

Caryn James of The New York Times called the film "leaden" and "competently made but dull", but praised Marg Helgenberger and Scott Cohen. She said they "rose above the script" while calling Ronny Cox bland and Kris Kristofferson drab.

See also
 Getting Away with Murder: The JonBenét Ramsey Mystery
 The Case of: JonBenét Ramsey
 My Sister, My Love

References

External links
 

2000 television films
2000 films
2000s crime drama films
American crime drama films
CBS network films
Films about beauty queens
Crime films based on actual events
Films directed by Lawrence Schiller
Films set in Colorado
Killing of JonBenét Ramsey
2000 drama films
American drama television films
2000s English-language films
2000s American films